Children of Crisis is a social study of children in the United States written by child psychiatrist Robert Coles and published in five volumes by Little, Brown and Company between 1967 and 1977. In 2003, the publisher released a one-volume compilation of selections from the series with a new introduction by the author. Volumes 2 and 3 shared (with Frances FitzGerald's Fire in the Lake: The Vietnamese and the Americans in Vietnam) the 1973 Pulitzer Prize for General Non-Fiction.

Volumes
Volume 1: A Study of Courage and Fear (1967)
Volume 2:  Migrants, Sharecroppers, Mountaineers (1971)
Volume 3: The South Goes North (1971)
Volume 4: Eskimos, Chicanos, Indians (1977) 
Volume 5: Privileged Ones: The Well-Off and the Rich in America (1977)

References

Child and adolescent psychiatry
History books about the United States
Little, Brown and Company books
Pulitzer Prize for General Non-Fiction-winning works
Academic works about pediatrics